International rankings of Bolivia is a list of  relative objective measurements for generally subjective qualities such as political corruption or ease of doing business.

General

Demographics

Economy

Military

Institute for Economics and Peace Global Peace Index ranked 81 out of 144

Politics

Transparency International Corruption Perceptions Index ranked 120 out of 180

Other

References

Bolivia